Berndt Lindfors (21 October 1932 – 19 February 2009) was a Finnish gymnast who competed in the 1952 Summer Olympics and in the 1956 Summer Olympics.

References

1932 births
2009 deaths
Finnish male artistic gymnasts
Olympic gymnasts of Finland
Gymnasts at the 1952 Summer Olympics
Gymnasts at the 1956 Summer Olympics
Olympic bronze medalists for Finland
Olympic medalists in gymnastics
Swedish-speaking Finns
Medalists at the 1956 Summer Olympics
Medalists at the 1952 Summer Olympics
20th-century Finnish people